The Endless is a 2017 American science fiction horror drama film directed, produced by and starring Justin Benson and Aaron Moorhead. Benson also wrote the film, while Moorhead was the cinematographer; both also acted as editors. It premiered on April 21, 2017, at the Tribeca Film Festival, before being released nationwide on April 6, 2018.

Co-starring Callie Hernandez, Tate Ellington, Lew Temple, and James Jordan, the film tells the story of two brothers (Benson and Moorhead) who visit an alleged cult to which they formerly belonged. The Endless may be interpreted as a partial sequel to Benson and Moorhead's 2012 film Resolution, as it shares the same universe and some of the same characters.

It received favorable reviews from critics.

Plot

Brothers Justin and Aaron Smith receive a video cassette in the mail made by Camp Arcadia, a group they belonged to as young children.  Justin and Aaron's recollection of events differ; Justin says the group was a UFO death cult, but Aaron recalls them as a harmless and friendly commune.  Aaron points out that the video cassette proves the members are still alive.  Justin, however, is worried that talk of "ascension" may be a code for some future mass suicide.  Fed up with their inability to make friends or find good jobs since leaving Camp Arcadia, Aaron convinces Justin to return for just one day.

Justin and Aaron head to the backwoods of San Diego and receive a friendly welcome at Camp Arcadia.  None of the members seem to have aged in the decade since the brothers left.  Anna and Lizzy take an interest in Aaron and Justin, respectively.  Although Aaron welcomes the attention, Justin stays aloof from everyone but his brother.  One of the members, Hal, excitedly shows Justin a physics equation he has been working on.  He says that he cannot explain what it represents, as it would be akin to describing an impossible color.  However, he hopes that Justin will eventually accept the group's beliefs now that he is older.  As they partake in various activities, Aaron grows increasingly fond of his time at Camp Arcadia, and he convinces Justin to stay an additional day.

During one activity, members attempt to win a tug-of-war against a rope that ascends into the dark night sky.  Justin says it is held by a member on a ladder but cannot explain how he loses when everyone else is present.  The brothers separately notice increasingly weird occurrences.  While exploring the woods, Justin becomes convinced an invisible entity is observing him, and it leaves him a photograph of a buoy.  When Justin presses Hal for answers, Hal admits that he knows no more than anyone else.  His physics equation is his interpretation of what is happening, and he encourages Justin to find his own answers by following the entity's clues.  He advises Justin to search the bottom of the lake under the buoy in the photograph.  Two moons rise in the sky and Hal explains away the second moon as an atmospheric phenomenon, then says that two moons brings the truth and three moons signifies the ascension.  Hal tells Justin to come to a conclusion before a third rises.

Justin and Aaron go fishing.  When Justin sees the buoy from the photograph, he dives into the water.  He returns with a toolbox and says that something else is under the water.  When they open the toolbox, they find a tape.  Freaked out by the strange events and ostentatious clues, Justin insists they leave immediately.  At the camp, Hal and Justin get into an argument after Hal plays the tape, which is a recording of Justin and Aaron misrepresenting Camp Arcadia to outsiders.  Justin calls Hal a cult leader, and Hal says Justin made up lurid stories to tell the press about Camp Arcadia.  Outraged that Justin was misleading him, too, Aaron refuses to leave.  Justin's car does not start, and he leaves to find help.

Justin encounters several people stuck in time loops, most of whom repeatedly experience their own violent deaths for the amusement of the entity.  They explain that the entity has trapped them and that he will also become trapped once the third moon rises.  Justin finds Aaron, who has come looking for him.  Justin explains their danger, but Aaron still wants to stay behind, as he cannot stand returning to his old life.  Aaron reasons that experiencing death at the hands of the entity, which is considered a sacred ritual by the cult, would be better than menial jobs and not having friends.  When Justin admits he was wrong to force Aaron into this lifestyle, Aaron becomes hopeful that their life can improve and agrees to leave.  The brothers barely escape as the entity appears to destroy the camp. The brothers are seen driving away while the members of the cult seem despondent that they have left.

Cast 
 
Justin Benson as Justin Smith
Aaron Moorhead as Aaron Smith
Callie Hernandez as Anna
Tate Ellington as Hal
Lew Temple as Tim
James Jordan as Shitty Carl
Shane Brady as Shane Williams
Kira Powell as Lizzy
David Lawson Jr. as Smiling Dave
Emily Montague as Jennifer Danube
Peter Cilella as Michael Danube
Vinny Curran as Chris Daniels
Glen Roberts as Woods

Production
The film was shot in Descanso, located in southeastern San Diego County.

Release
The film premiered at the Tribeca Film Festival on April 21, 2017. On May 1, 2017, Well Go USA Entertainment acquired distribution rights to the film. The film was released on April 6, 2018, by Well Go USA Entertainment.

Critical reception
On review aggregator website Rotten Tomatoes, the film holds an approval rating of 92% based on 130 reviews and an average rating of 7.5/10. The website's critical consensus reads, "The Endless benefits from its grounded approach to an increasingly bizarre story, elevated by believable performances by filmmakers Justin Benson and Aaron Moorhead." On Metacritic, the film has a weighted average score of 80 out of 100, based on 18 critics, indicating "generally favorable reviews".

Matt Zoller Seitz of RogerEbert.com gave the film 3½ stars, stating, "If you have a good idea, a strong cast, a smart script, and directorial chops, you don't need a lot of money to make a compelling movie. The Endless is proof."

Horror novelist and podcaster Brian Keene praised the film on social media, tweeting "The Endless is a true horror masterpiece—a David Lynch meets Stuart Gordon meets Don Coscarelli fever dream of Lovecraftian cosmic horror that demands repeated viewings."

See also
 List of films featuring time loops
 List of media set in San Diego

References

External links
 
 

2017 films
2017 horror films
2017 horror thriller films
2010s science fiction horror films
American science fiction horror films
American science fiction thriller films
American horror thriller films
Time loop films
Films about cults
Films directed by Aaron Moorhead
Films directed by Justin Benson
American supernatural horror films
Films set in San Diego
Films shot in San Diego
Lovecraftian horror
2010s English-language films
2010s American films